Miyakea expansa is a moth in the family Crambidae. It was described by Arthur Gardiner Butler in 1881. It is found in Japan and South Korea.

The wingspan is 11–13 mm.

References

Crambini
Moths described in 1881
Moths of Asia